SVP Hospital or Sardar Vallabhbhai Patel Institute of Medical Sciences and Research is a public hospital and medical college in Ahmedabad, India. It was inaugurated by the Prime Minister of India, Narendra Modi, on 17 January 2019. The building, consisting of 17 floors, a ground floor, and two basements, was built at a cost of 750 crores by Amdavad Municipal Corporation.

History 
The construction of a new multi-specialty hospital was proposed in 2013 under the Chief Minister's Swarnim Shaheri Vikas Yojna with funding of Rs. 331 crore. The proposed location was next to the existing VS Hospital.

Facilities 
The hospital features 1,500 beds, 32 operation theaters, 139 ICU beds, 90 consultation rooms, and a helipad for the air ambulance. The hospital utilizes a pneumatic tube system to send samples to laboratories in seconds. It has colleges of physiotherapy, medicine, and nursing.

References 

2019 establishments in Gujarat
Hospitals established in 2019
Hospitals in Ahmedabad